Pook may refer to:

Pook, Kalibo, a barangay of Kalibo, Aklan, Philippines
 Pook (surname) includes list of persons with the name
 Pook (Wee 3), character in children's TV series Wee 3

See also
 Puck (disambiguation)
 Pooky (disambiguation)